Léon Dumont (February 5, 1837 in Valenciennes – January 17, 1877 in Valenciennes) was a French psychologist and philosopher. He influenced William James and is perhaps best known for his treatise on the causes of laughter (Des causes du rire).

Dumont's closing thoughts from the last page of Des causes du rire 
The miserable beggar said to the King of France, "Thy image is everywhere except in my pocket."
One has seen that to laugh is to disarm hate and anger and to extract from some judges indulgence for a sin. In a word, the good joke, applied appropriately to any subject, has the effect of sweetening the deal for us:
Ridiculum acri
fortius et melius magnus plerumque secat res. - Horace
(A good joke often cuts an important deal strongly and sweetly.)
But, like any free action, the joke submits to the law of morality; the joke is virtuous or the joke is evil. In general, the joke only has moral value in the mouth of a morally serious person.

See also

See for evidence that Dumont influenced Williams James 
 The Principles of Psychology In Chapter 4, William James praises Dumont's De l'habitude, Revue Philosophique, TOME I, pages 321-366.

See other topics related to Léon Dumont
 History of biology#Nineteenth century: the emergence of biological disciplines
 History of psychology#Early French

Selected works

Des causes du rire (1862)
Jean Paul et sa poétique (1862)
Le Sentiment du gracieux (1863) 
Antoine Watteau (1866) 
Théorie de l'évolution en Allemagne (1873)
Théorie Scientifique de la Sensibilité (1875)
De l'habitude (1876)
La théorie de la sensibilité (1876)
Vergnügen und Schmerz : zur Lehre von den Gefühlen (Théorie scientifique de la sensibilité, dt.) Autoris. Ausg. Leipzig : Brockhaus, 1876 (Internationale Wissenschaftliche Bibliothek ; 22)

References 
 Alexandre Büchner: Un philosophe amateur. Essai biographique sur Léon Dumont (1837-1877), avec des extraits de sa correspondance. Paris: Editions Félix Alcan 1884

External links 

 Serge NICOLAS: Histoire de la psychologie française au XIXe siècle (frz.)
 Philosophie et psychologie en France (1877)
 Complete original text of Des causes du rire (1862)
 https://www.scribd.com/doc/16147579/Leon-A-Dumont-Haeckel-et-la-theorie-de-levolution-en-Allemagne-1873
 Complete original text of Un philosophe amateur (1884)
 The Sense of Humor, 1921. Pages 157-9 of Max Eastman's book discuss Dumont's ideas on laughter.

French psychologists
19th-century French philosophers
People from Valenciennes
1837 births
1877 deaths
French male non-fiction writers
19th-century French male writers